The 2022–23 Stars League, or the QSL, also called QNB Stars League for sponsorship reasons, is scheduled to be the 49th edition of top-level football championship in Qatar. The league will kick off in August 1, 2022 and is expected to end in March 2023. Al-Sadd are the defending champion.

This season had an extended break due to 2022 FIFA World Cup being held in Qatar.

Teams

Stadia and locations
In August and September clubs played their matches in the 2022 FIFA World Cup venues. Beside that, some clubs play in multiple stadiums throughout the season.

Personnel and kits

Foreign players
All teams could register as many foreign players as they want, but only five professional players could be included in match roster.

 Players name in bold indicates the player is registered during the mid-season transfer window.
 Players in italics were out of squad or left club within the season, after pre-season transfer window, or in the mid-season transfer window, and at least had one appearance.

Notes

League table

Results

Season statistics

Top scorers

Hat-tricks

Top assists

References

Qatar Stars League
Stars League